Darren Appleton (born 8 February 1976) is an English pool player, best known for playing Eight-ball, Nine-ball and Ten-ball pool.

Appleton won the 2008 WPA World Ten-ball Championship (the inaugural 10-ball world championship) against Wu Jia-qing, of China, a former world champion in both nine-ball and eight-ball. Appleton is also a world champion in nine-ball, having won the 2012 WPA World Nine-ball Championship, defeating Li He-wen in the final.

His entrance by walk on music from “Here I Go Again” by Whitesnake.

Career

Early career
Appleton, who started playing pool at age 12, was formerly the world ranked no. 1 player in British-style eight-ball pool. He was twice runner-up in the WEPF Eight-ball Pool World Championship. In 2006, he joined the International Pool Tour's standardised eight-ball competition. In 2008, he won the Straight Pool Challenge at the Derby City Classic.

World Ten-ball Champion (2008–2012)
On 5 October 2008, Appleton claimed an upset victory in the inaugural WPA Ten-ball World Championship over Wu Jia-qing, 13–11, winning the US$100,000 top prize: "I've waited 16 years for this and have to enjoy the moment. I had mixed feelings and I was looking back at my disappointments in the past. I was ranked first (earlier in the decade) in the world but I have never won a world championship... It was a dream come true for me and I'm happy to win the title here in the Philippines."

In May 2009, Appleton challenged Dennis Hatch of the United States in a three-day race-to-100 challenge match of ten-ball. Hatch, however, came out the victor with a score of 100–83. In the same year, he won the World Pool Masters tournament by defeating Nick van den Berg.

Darren Appleton also won the 2010 U.S. Open 9-ball Championship against Corey Deuel of the United States in a match that went into extra racks. Appleton was a member of the victorious European team in the 2010 Mosconi Cup. He was named MVP for the tournament, after winning 5 of his 6 matches in the series. In 2011 he defended his title, winning the U.S. Open 9-Ball Championship again.

World Nine-ball Champion (2012–present)
In 2012, Appleton won the WPA World Nine-ball Championship, subduing China's Li Hewen in the final with a score of 13–12. Later, in 2013, he also won the nine-ball tournament at the World Games 2013, beating Chang Jung-lin 11–10 in the final. 
In 2014, he won the Dragon 14.1 Tournament, defeating Shane Van Boening in the final. Also he won 2014 World Cup of Pool playing with Karl Boyes for Team England. On 2 February 2015, Darren Appleton won the 2015 CBSA World Chinese Eight-ball Championship, defeating world champion snooker player Mark Selby 21–19 in the final.

Titles and achievements
 2017 Billiard Congress of America Hall of Fame
 2017 Super Billiards Expo One Pocket Championship 
 2016 Mosconi Cup
 2016 Super Billiards Expo One Pocket Championship 
 2015 Mosconi Cup
 2015 CBSA World Chinese Eight-ball Championship
 2015 Kings Cup 10-Ball Team East vs. West 
 2015 American Straight Pool Championship 
 2014 Mosconi Cup
 2014 Accu-Stats All-Star Invitational
 2014 Dragon 14.1 Tournament
 2014 Accu-Stats 8-Ball Invitational
 2014 American Straight Pool Championship 
 2013 EPBF Player of the Year
 2013 Mosconi Cup
 2013 World Games Nine-ball Singles 
 2013 West Coast Challenge 10-Ball
 2013 Derby City Classic 14.1 Challenge
 2013 West Coast Challenge One Pocket
 2012 Mosconi Cup
 2012 International Challenge of Champions 
 2012 WPA World Nine-ball Championship
 2011 Mosconi Cup
 2011 U.S. Open 9-Ball Championship 
 2011 International Challenge of Champions 
 2011 Beassy 9-Ball Open 
 2011 World Cup of Pool - with (Karl Boyes)
 2010 Billiards Digest Player of the Year 
 2010 Mosconi Cup (MVP) 
 2010 Mosconi Cup
 2010 WPA World Team Championship
 2010 U.S. Open 9-Ball Championship 
 2010 Euro Tour Costa Blanca Open
 2009 World Pool Masters 
 2008 Derby City Classic 14.1 Challenge  
 2009 CSI US Bar Table 10-Ball Championship
 2009 EPBF Nations Cup Championship  
 2008 Euro Tour Italy Open
 2008 WPA World Ten-ball Championship
 2007 International 8-ball Championship
 2006 BCA Grand Masters 8-ball

References

External links

Appleton's official website

English pool players
1978 births
Living people
World champions in pool
World Games gold medalists
Competitors at the 2013 World Games
WPA World Nine-ball Champions
WPA World Ten-ball Champions